Douce violence  is a 1962 French drama film directed by Max Pécas and starring Elke Sommer, Pierre Brice, Christian Pezey and Vittoria Prada.

Plot
An aleniated young man living on the Côte d'Azur is lured into joining a gang of petty young criminals, but soon realises he has made a mistake.

Cast
 Elke Sommer - Elke
 Pierre Brice - Maddy
 Agnès Spaak - Dominique
 Claire Maurier - Claire
 Christian Pezey - Olivier
 Vittoria Prada - Barbara
 Jenny Astruc - Mick
 Michèle Bardollet - Choutte

References

External links
 

1962 films
1962 drama films
1960s French-language films
French drama films
1960s French films